Gustaf Ekberg is a retired Swedish footballer. Ekberg made 18 Svenska Serien appearances for Djurgården and scored 1 goals.

References

Swedish footballers
Djurgårdens IF Fotboll players
Svenska Serien players
Association footballers not categorized by position
Year of birth missing